The Handelsorganisation (“Trading Organisation”, or HO) was a national retail business owned by the central administration of the Soviet Zone of occupation in Germany and from 1949 on by the state of the German Democratic Republic. It was created in 1948. The enterprise was arranged into different departments – industrial goods, food, restaurants and department stores – and operated the large “Centrum” department stores in many cities of the GDR. Its stores stood in competition to those of the Konsum cooperative. Nevertheless, both were established brands in the everyday life in the GDR. The HO also operated hotels. After the political turmoil in the GDR in the years 1989 and 1990 the business was sold by the Treuhand trust.

See also
Economy of the German Democratic Republic

Organisations based in East Germany
Economy of East Germany
East Germany–Soviet Union relations
Retail companies of the Soviet Union
1948 establishments in Germany
Retail companies established in 1948
1990 disestablishments in East Germany
Retail companies disestablished in 1990
Companies of East Germany